Grace Zia Chu (April 23, 1899 – April 15, 1999) was an author of Chinese cookbooks and a major figure in American Chinese culinary world. Chu introduced generations of Americans to Chinese cooking.

Personal life 
Grace Zia Chu was born in Shanghai on 23 April 1899. Her parents were Zia Hong-lai and Sochen Sze. Grace Anna Zia attended the McTyeire School and later Wellesley College in the United States. Upon graduation in 1924, Zia returned to teach in China at McTyeire and Ginling College. 

In 1928, Zia married Chu Shih-ming, who was appointed military attache to the Chinese Embassy in Washington, D.C. in 1941, representing the Nationalist government. She returned to China after World War II, only to resettle in the United States  by 1950. Five years later, Zia naturalized as an American citizen, and moved to New York City, where she taught cooking at her home, the China Institute, and the Mandarin House restaurant. Zia moved to Columbus, Ohio after Chu died in 1965. Zia died at the age of 99 in Columbus on April 15, 1999.

Notable works 
The New York Times called her 1962 cookbook The Pleasures of Chinese Cooking. Chu authored Madame Chu's Chinese Cooking School in 1975, a detailed cookbook for the beginner to advanced cook.

Awards and honours
Grace Zia Chu was named Grande Dame of Les Dames d'Escoffier, New York Chapter in 1984.

See also
 Chinese Americans in New York City

References

External links
Papers of Grace Zia Chu, 1941-1986. Schlesinger Library, Radcliffe Institute, Harvard University.

1899 births
1999 deaths
American food writers
American cookbook writers
Wellesley College alumni
Chinese emigrants to the United States
Women cookbook writers
Chinese cookbook writers
Writers from Shanghai
Writers from New York City
People from Columbus, Ohio
Academic staff of Nanjing Normal University
American women non-fiction writers
20th-century American women
20th-century American people
American women academics